Vanesa Capó Pérez (born October 3, 1982, in Balearic Islands) is an S6 swimmer from Spain.  She has cerebral palsy.  She competed at the 2000 Summer Paralympics. She competed at the 2004 Summer Paralympics, where she earned a silver medal in the 4 x 50 meter Relay 20pts race.

References 

Living people
1982 births
Sportspeople from Palma de Mallorca
Spanish female freestyle swimmers
Paralympic silver medalists for Spain
Swimmers at the 2000 Summer Paralympics
Swimmers at the 2004 Summer Paralympics
Paralympic medalists in swimming
Medalists at the 2004 Summer Paralympics
Paralympic swimmers of Spain
S6-classified Paralympic swimmers